Providence is an unincorporated community in Orangeburg County, South Carolina, United States. Providence is located at the junction of U.S. Route 176 and South Carolina Highway 210, northeast of Bowman.

References

Unincorporated communities in Orangeburg County, South Carolina
Unincorporated communities in South Carolina